St. Francisville or Saint Francisville is an unincorporated community and census-designated place in northeast Clark County, Missouri, United States. As of the 2020 census, its population was 137.

The community is on Missouri Route B four miles north of Wayland. The Des Moines River and the Missouri-Iowa border are one-half mile north of the community.

Demographics

Etymology
St. Francisville was platted in 1833, by a man named Francis Church.

References

Census-designated places in Clark County, Missouri
Unincorporated communities in Clark County, Missouri
Unincorporated communities in Missouri